Chun Ching Hang (born 16 July 1989) is a Hong Kong footballer who plays as a forward for the Hong Kong women's national team.

Club career
Chun Ching Hang has played for Swansea City in Wales.

International career
Chun Ching Hang represented Hong Kong at two AFC Women's Asian Cup qualification editions (2014 and 2018), the 2016 AFC Women's Olympic Qualifying Tournament, the 2017 EAFF E-1 Football Championship and the 2018 Asian Games.

International goals

See also
List of Hong Kong women's international footballers

References

1989 births
Living people
People from Kowloon
Hong Kong women's footballers
Women's association football forwards
Hong Kong women's international footballers
Hong Kong expatriate footballers
Hong Kong expatriate sportspeople in Wales
Expatriate women's footballers in Wales
Footballers at the 2014 Asian Games
Footballers at the 2018 Asian Games
Asian Games competitors for Hong Kong